The results of the Sweet Adelines International competition for quartets in the years 2010–2019 are as follows.

For the equivalent scores in the chorus competition see Sweet Adelines International chorus competitions, 2010–2019 and full explanation of the scoring system, qualification process, awards and records, see Sweet Adelines International competition. 

Note that the grand total listed in the "final" column is the cumulative total of scores achieved in the semi-final and final rounds of competition. Quartets can contain members who are registered in different regions, in which case all their regions are listed. However, they must qualify through one of those regions - that one is marked in bold. In addition to the direct-qualifying places, wildcard places are awarded to the 10 highest-scoring non-winning quartets across all regional competitions. This is indicated as "[wild]". Quartets which place 2nd–15th in the international quartet competition are also allowed to qualify directly for the following year if they wish, without competing at the regional level. This is indicated by "[pre-qualified]".

2010

 ReMix, Spirit and Razzcals quartets qualified and were to compete in position number 7, 14 and 35 respectively but all withdrew from the competition before it began. Therefore Mojo competed 7th but are officially listed as contestant number 8, Dream Girls are officially listed as contestant number 15 and Sound Advice as contestant number 36.

2011

iCappella qualified and were to compete in position number 37 but withdrew from the competition before it began. Therefore Shades of Jade competed 37th but are officially listed as contestant number 38.

2012

 Shimmer, East Coast Style, Capri, Firefly and Whole Lotta Harmony quartets qualified and were to compete in position number 17, 31, 40, 43 and 48 respectively but all withdrew from the competition before it began. Therefore Sassy competed 17th but are officially listed as contestant number 18, Touché are officially listed as contestant number 32, Vocality as 41, Hi-Jinx as 44 and Dream as 49.

2013

 ReMix quartet qualified and were to compete in position number 1 but all withdrew from the competition before it began. Therefore Echo competed 1st but are officially listed as contestant number 2.

2014

 Dolce, Swingline and a.k.a. quartets qualified and were to compete in position number 24, 31 and 35 respectively but all withdrew from the competition before it began. Therefore Glow competed 24th but are officially listed as contestant number 25, In Sync are officially listed as contestant number 32 and Finesse as contestant number 36.

2015
The 2015 competition was held on 6 and 9 October at the MGM Grand Las Vegas.

GQ quartet qualified and was to compete in position number 15 but withdrew from the competition before it began. Therefore Monarch competed in 15th position but are officially listed as contestant number 16.

2016
The 2016 competition was held on 17–22 October at the MGM Grand Las Vegas, the first time the competition was held at the same location twice in a row. The finalists included two quartets which had previously won the Rising Star competition (ClassRing and GQ) and a third (Windsor) with three members of two past Rising Star winning quartets — Royal Blush and The Ladies.

Swingline, CRUSH, Glow and Drive! quartets all qualified and were to compete as contestants number 1, 14, 26 and 40. but withdrew from the competition before it began. Therefore subsequent contestants competed in those places but retain their original contestant numbers.

2017
The 2017 competition was held on 11 and 13 October. For the third year running, it was held at the MGM Grand Las Vegas.

SpinOff, Vocality and Milli Blink quartet qualified and were to compete as contestants number 10, 27, and 38 but withdrew from the competition before it began. Therefore subsequent contestants competed in those places but retain their original contestant numbers.

2018
The 2018 competition semifinal was held on October 17, and the final on October 19, at The Dome at America's Center in St. Louis, Missouri. The winners, ClassRing, had obtained second place the previous year and had won the 2014 Rising Star competition. Second place was won by Viva! who had qualified with a record score of 715.

Neon Lights, Boston Accent, Glow, Finesse, GQ, and Legacy quartet qualified and were to compete as contestants number 2, 14, 16, 36, 39, and 44 but withdrew from the competition before it began. Therefore subsequent contestants competed in those places but retain their original contestant numbers.

2019
The 2019 competition will take place in September at the Smoothie King Center, New Orleans.

References

Sources
Sweet Adelines International homepage
 
Barbershophistory.com homepage
historical quartet results
competition records
Sweet Adelines Scores Yahoo! Group [registration required]

Sweet Adelines International competitions